Lovat Shinty Club is a shinty club from Kiltarlity, Inverness-shire, Scotland.  The club was formed in 1888  and has a healthy rivalry with near neighbours Beauly.  The club takes its name from the area within which it plays in and shared this name with the late Second World War hero, Lord Lovat.

History
Founded in 1888, the club has never folded but did merge with Beauly early in the 20th century and won the Camanachd Cup in 1912/13 as the combined team.  After the first war, the team also reached the final in 1925.

In 1953 was Lovat's finest hour, achieving the Grand Slam, winning every single competition  they entered at Senior and Junior level, they were the first club to ever achieve this feat.  The same set of players had previously won the Celtic Society Cup which was a South District Competition in 1950 and 1951.

Despite being close to Inverness, Lovat still maintain two strong teams due to a strong youth policy and the support of the local primary school.  The club is always well represented at youth international level.

The club hosts the traditional Lovat V Beauly New Year's Day match AKA the Lovat Cup every year.  This game attracts the largest crowd for a shinty match outside of the Camanachd Cup final.

In November 2007, following Kinlochshiels' draw with Caberfeidh, Lovat became a Marine Harvest Premier Division Team. This was a massive achievement for the Kiltarlity side and was somewhat ahead of schedule given the very young age of the team.

However, Lovat's 2008 season in the Premier Division was a hard campaign and the club was eventually relegated having been marooned at the bottom of the league for almost the whole season.  The club's first team won North Division One again in 2009, this marked a successful season for the club where its second team had also reached the Sutherland and Strathdearn Cup finals, losing to Fort William on both occasions.

Lovat had a successful season in 2010, surviving in the Premier Division and seeing the second team again reach the finals of the Strathdearn and Sutherland.  Again, the club faced the same team as opponents, playing Glenurquhart in both games.  Lovat lost the Strathdearn but claimed the Sutherland live on BBC Alba. This victory was notable as it was held at the Eilan in Newtonmore, just down the road from the Dell in Kingussie where Lovat had secured a rare point against Kingussie earlier in the day.

2011 saw Lovat play well but never fully extricate themselves from relegation trouble until their final match of the season when a 3–2 win over Kilmallie secured Premier Division shinty for another year.  James Gallacher & John MacRitchie stepped down from their roles as co-managers to be replaced by successful second-team manager Allan MacRae.

Lovat achieved their highest league placing since their glory days winning the North Division One, with a third-place finish in the 2012 Premiership.

On 15 June 2013 Lovat won their first major trophy since 1953 when they won the MacTavish Cup. They also secured a highest ever Premiership finish as runners-up to Newtonmore, and finished the season with the best defensive record in shinty. As well as tasting reserve success in the Strathdearn Cup.  They retained the MacTavish Cup in 2014, reinforcing their position as the most successful side in the competition outside the Badenoch giants, Kingussie & Newtonmore, having won the trophy eight times in all. They finished the season in second but pushed Newtonmore much harder than in 2013.

In 2015, Lovat had, by recent standards, a poor league season. However, under John Macritchie, they did lift the Camanachd cup, the biggest prize in the game. Kyles Athletic were the opponents this tie was played in Oban. It was a tight contest and finished 2-1 thanks to a Kevin Bartlett double and an Albert Smith medal winning performance from Stuart MacDonald.

After this the club went on a run of making 3 of the next 5 Camanachd Cup finals. However on each occasion we’re defeated, twice by Newtonmore during their 4 titles in a row and once by Kinlochshiel on their first ever victory.
 
The junior side had post Covid success winning the 2021 Strathdearn cup on penalties against Newtonmore after being 4-0 down in extra time.

Ladies team

 
Lovat established a ladies team in 2011, which plays in National Division Two.  The area had a long tradition of girls playing shinty alongside boys until a certain age, with players leaving the sport.  In the 2010s, local talent was corralled by Gillian Currie and Gemma MacKinnon, two Scotland internationalists who had settled in the area, into a first ever Lovat ladies team.  Scotland internationalist youngster, Laura Gallacher, also returned to her home club after several years playing for Glengarry.. The club was featured in the "Swags" documentary on BBC Alba, Christmas 2013.

Club staff

External links
Lovat Official Website

Shinty teams
Sport in Highland (council area)
1888 establishments in Scotland
Sports clubs established in 1888